Yusuf Khan (also spelled Yusof Khan) was a Safavid gholam and official of Armenian origin who was governor of Astarabad (1604), Shamakhi (1610-?), and Shirvan (1610–1624) during the reign of King Abbas I (r. 1588–1629). Originally a Christian, Yusuf was first employed in the royal mews, and because of his skill in handling and hunting birds and animals, he was soon given the rank of "master of the hunt" (mīr shekār-bāshi). Thereafter, he became governor of Shirvan and Shamakhi.

When Abbas I decided to marry his granddaughter to Semayun Khan (Simon II) in 1624, Yusuf Khan was ordered by Qarachaqay Khan, likewise of Christian Armenian origin and a childhood friend, to host the banquet in the first term of the wedding party.

Yusuf Khan was murdered on the orders of Murav Beg (Giorgi Saakadze), after the latter decided to conspire with the Georgian rebel leaders.

Sources
 
 
  
  
 

17th-century deaths
Persian Armenians
Safavid governors of Astarabad
Safavid governors
Shamakhi District
Safavid governors of Shirvan
Ethnic Armenian Shia Muslims
Armenian former Christians
Masters of the hunt of the Safavid Empire
17th-century people of Safavid Iran
Converts to Shia Islam from Christianity
Safavid ghilman